The year 1617 in music involved some significant events.

Events 
January 6 – The Vision of Delight, a masque  written by Ben Jonson and designed by Inigo Jones, is performed at Whitehall Palace, probably for the first time on this date, with a second performance of January 19. The work features music by Nicholas Lanier.
January 16 – Thomas Weelkes, organist at Chichester Cathedral, is dismissed for being drunk and disorderly.
February 22 –  Lovers Made Men, another masque by Jonson, Jones, and Lanier, is performed. (Lanier's music for the masque may have featured recitatives throughout; if so, it would have been a significant precursor of English opera, but this cannot be certain as the music has not survived.)
August 30 – Alessandro Grandi is appointed singer at San Marco, Venice, at a salary of 80 ducats per annum, under choirmaster Claudio Monteverdi.
December 29 – John Bull is appointed cathedral organist in Antwerp, with a salary of 80 florins a year plus a special supplement of 20 florins.
Lutenist and composer Jacques Gaultier flees to England from France after being involved in a murder.

Publications 
Agostino Agresta – First book of madrigals for six voices (Naples: Costantino Vitale)
Gregor Aichinger
 (Ingolstadt, Gregor Haenlin) for four voices and basso continuo.
 (Dillingen, Gregor Haenlin) for four voices and basso continuo, dedicated to Maximilian Fugger.
Giovanni Andreini, Claudio Monteverdi, Salamone Rossi, Muzio Effrem, Alessandro Ghivizzani –  (Venice, Bartolomeo Magni) "Sacra Rappresentazione" (i.e. an oratorio). 
Giovanni Francesco Anerio
, madrigals for 1, 2, 3, and 4 voices (Rome: Giovanni Battista Robletti)
 (Rome: Giovanni Battista Robletti), a collection of motets, madrigals, canzonettas, dialogues, and arias
Bartolomeo Barbarino – Madrigals for three voices and theorbo or harpsichord (Venice: Ricciardo Amadino), also includes some madrigals for solo voice
Girolamo Belli – Ninth book of madrigals for five voices, Op. 22 (Venice: Bartolomeo Magni for Gardano)
Jean Baptiste Besard –  (Augsburg, D. Franck), collection of lute music. 
William Brade –  for five instruments (Hamburg: Michael Hering), a collection of dance music
Antonio Brunelli –  for one, two, three, and four voices, Op. 13 (Venice: Giacomo Vincenti)
Thomas Campion – The Third and Fourth Booke of Ayres (London, Thomas Snodham), "so as they may be expressed by one voyce, with a violl, lute, or orpharion."
Antonio Cifra
Fourth book of madrigals for five voices (Rome: Giovanni Battista Robletti)
Camillo Cortellini – Masses for eight voices (Venice: Giacomo Vincenti)
Richard Dering –  for five voices with basso continuo (Antwerp: Pierre Phalèse)
Melchior Franck
 for twelve voices (Coburg: Justus Coburg), a festival motet
 for twelve voices in three choirs (Coburg: Justus Hauck), a wedding motet
 for eight voices (Coburg: Justus Hauck), a wedding motet
 (Coburg: Justus Hauck)
Marco da Gagliano – Sixth book of madrigals for five voices (Venice: Bartolomeo Magni)
Andreas Hakenberger –  for six, seven, eight, nine, ten, and twelve voices with organ bass (Frankfurt: Gottfried Tampach)
Biagio Marini – Affetti musicali (Musical Affections), Op. 1 (Venice)
Pietro Pace
, Op. 14 (Venice: Giacomo Vincenti)
, Op. 15 (Venice: Giacomo Vincenti)
Vincenzo Pace - , 3 books, Op. 1–3 (Venice: Bartolomeo Magni for Gardano)
Giovanni Palazzotto e Tagliavia — First book of madrigals to five voices (Naples: Costantino Vitale)
Francesco Pasquali – , Op. 2 (Venice: Giacomo Vincenti)
Enrico Antonio Radesca – Fifth book of canzonettas, madrigals and arias for one and two voices (Venice: Giacomo Vincenti)
Johann Hermann Schein – Banchetto musicale, newer … Padouanen, Gagliarden, Courenten und Allemanden à 5, auff allerley Instrumenten (Leipzig).

Classical music

Opera 
Giordano Giacobbi –

Births 
April 3 – Antimo Liberati, Italian music theorist, composer, and contralto singer (d. 1692)

Deaths 
February 16 – Kaspar Ulenberg, German theologian, poet, and composer (born 1549)
April 5 – Alonso Lobo, Spanish composer (born 1555)
August 8 – Tarquinia Molza, Italian singer (born 1542)
August 16 – Giovanni Bassano, cornet player and composer (born c. 1560)
date unknown
Cesare Bendinelli, Italian trumpet player (born c. 1542)
Robert Jones, lutenist and composer (born c. 1577)

References 

 
Music
17th century in music
Music by year